The  is a city tram station on the Takaoka Kidō Line located in Takaoka, Toyama Prefecture, Japan. The station was renamed from Izumi-chō on May 7, 1958.

Surrounding area
Takaoka Police Station
Takaoka City Agricultural Cooperative
Takaoka Commerce Building

Railway stations in Toyama Prefecture